The 2020–21 SV Darmstadt 98 season is the 123rd season in the football club's history and their 21st overall season in the second tier of German football, the 2. Bundesliga. It is the club's fourth consecutive season in the second division, since relegation from the Bundesliga in 2016–17. In addition to the domestic league, Darmstadt also participated in this season's edition of the DFB-Pokal. The season covers the period from 1 July 2020 to 30 June 2021.

Squad

Squad information

Transfers

Pre-season and friendlies

Competitions

Overview

Bundesliga

League table

Results summary

Results by round

Matches

DFB-Pokal

Notes

References

External links

SV Darmstadt 98 seasons
Darmstadt